Agostinho José Sartori (29 May 1929 – 6 June 2012) was Bishop of the Roman Catholic Diocese of Palmas-Francisco Beltrão, Brazil.

Ordained to the priesthood in 1952, Sartori became a bishop in 1970 and retired on 24 August 2005.

Sartori was hospitalized on 26 May 2012. He died on 6 June of complications arising from Alzheimer's and Parkinson's disease.

Notes

20th-century Roman Catholic bishops in Brazil
Deaths from Alzheimer's disease
Deaths from Parkinson's disease
Deaths from dementia in Brazil
Neurological disease deaths in Paraná (state)
1929 births
2012 deaths
21st-century Roman Catholic bishops in Brazil
Roman Catholic bishops of Palmas–Francisco Beltrão